In organic chemistry, the chloromethyl group is a functional group that has the chemical formula . The naming of this group is derived from the methyl group (which has the formula ), by replacing one hydrogen atom by a chlorine atom. Compounds with this group are a subclass of the organochlorines.

The way of introducing a chloromethyl group into aromatic compounds is the chloromethylation by the Blanc reaction.

See also 
 Trichloromethyl group

References 

Organochlorides
Functional groups